John Inglis (9 December 1777 – 27 October 1850) was the third bishop of the Diocese of Nova Scotia, serving at St. Paul's Church (Halifax). He was the son of Bishop Charles Inglis. He is buried at St Mary's Church, Battersea, England.

Life
John Inglis was ordained a deacon December 13, 1801 by Bishop Charles Inglis, his father. On 27 June 1802 he was ordained a priest.

John was appointed as official secretary and as ecclesiastical commissary to his father. This involved a number of trips to England on behalf of the diocese. These trips also enhanced his own career and brought focus on his talents. However, his relative inexperience and the overtones of nepotism did not allow his promotion in 1812 when the bishop was seriously incapacitated.

Inglis became the third bishop in 1825. He was consecrated  26/27 March 1825. In the 25 years preceding this elevation, he had proven to be a talented and caring priest. He had been chaplain to the House of Assembly, a stalwart ally of King’s College, and a defender of the official position of the Church of England. He died on 27 October 1850.

Shortly after his return to Nova Scotia, he divided the diocese into four archdeaconries.  The archdeacons and locations are shown below.

 Ven. George Best, Archdeacon of New Brunswick
 Ven. George Coster, Archdeacon of Newfoundland
 Ven. Aubrey Spencer, Archdeacon of Bermuda
 Ven. Dr. Robert Willis, Archdeacon of Nova Scotia and Rector of St. Paul's, Halifax

References

External links
Bishop John Inglis, 3rd Bishop
Bishop Inglis interviews Shanawdithit
Inglis family and the Church

1777 births
1850 deaths
Anglican bishops of Nova Scotia and Prince Edward Island
19th-century Anglican Church of Canada bishops
Inglis family